Colton Dayne Tapp is an American actor, model and musician. Tapp is known in film for his roles in Three Days in August, Solar Eclipse: Depth of Darkness, Pi Day Die Day, The Boundary and Expulsion.

Career

Film 
In 2016, Tapp earned a breakout role as the son of an Irish painter in the movie, Three Days in August, directed by Johnathan Brownlee, which premiered at Dallas International Film Festival and internationally premiered at Montreal World Film Festival. Although not his first film, this role led him to following roles in films such as Pi Day Die Day, starring alongside Ari Lehman, John Wilkes Booth in Solar Eclipse: Depth of Darkness, a feature historic film shot in Sri Lanka about the rise and fall of Mahatma Gandhi and Abraham Lincoln, and The Boundary co-starring with "Neil DeGrasse Tyson". Tapp went on to film scifi-thriller Expulsion, where he performs dual roles as two versions of himself on different sides of a portal acted along-side Lar Park-Lincoln from Friday the 13th, Part VII.

Awards
Best Actor (Texas Horror Film Festival, Performance in Something's Here, 2015)
Best Film (Producer, Rack Focus Film Festival 2% Evil, 2016)
Best Film (Producer, Rack Focus Film Festival, The Precinct, 2017)
State Champion (Texas UIL State Finals, The Boundary)

Filmography

Film

TV

References

External links
 

Living people
American male film actors
Year of birth missing (living people)
Male actors from Texas
People from Wylie, Texas